Dolný Kubín District (okres Dolný Kubín) is a district in
the Žilina Region of central Slovakia. District is located in a hilly area north of Malá Fatra mountain range. Core of the district economy represent engineering, electrical engineering, metallurgy and wood processing industry. In the district are several middle-sized construction companies. Its seat and center is its largest town Dolný Kubín.

Municipalities

References

External links 
 http://www.dolnykubin.sk
 

Districts of Slovakia
Žilina Region